Urs Dick (born 9 October 1960) is a former Swiss curler. He played  skip position on the Swiss rink that won a gold medal at the 1992 Winter Olympics when curling was a demonstration sport. Later that year, he won a bronze medal at his first appearance at the 1992 European Curling Championships. He is also a Swiss mixed curling champion curler (1993) and curling coach.

Teams

Men's

Mixed

Record as a coach of national teams

Private life
His younger brother Jürgen "Jürg" Dick is also a curler and Urs's teammate in 1992 Olympic team.

References

External links

 Urs Dick | Profil - Once an Olympian - always an Olympian | swiss olympians

Living people
1960 births
Swiss male curlers
People from Solothurn
Curlers at the 1992 Winter Olympics
Olympic curlers of Switzerland
Swiss curling champions
Swiss curling coaches
Sportspeople from the canton of Solothurn
20th-century Swiss people